Ibbin Samaan is a small town in western Aleppo Governorate, northwestern Syria. With a population of 6,220 as per the 2004 census, the town is the administrative center of Nahiya Ibbin Samaan.

References

Populated places in Atarib District